The 1957 Football Championship of UkrSSR were part of the 1957 Soviet republican football competitions in the Soviet Ukraine.

First group stage

Group 1

Group 2

Group 3

Group 4

Group 5

Group 6

Group 7

Group 8

Group 9

Final

Promotion play-off
 FC Shakhtar Kadiivka – SKVO Odessa 0:2 0:2

References

External links
 1957. Football Championship of the UkrSSR (1957. Первенство УССР.) Luhansk Nash Futbol.
 Group 1: ukr-football.org.ua
 Group 2: ukr-football.org.ua
 Group 3: ukr-football.org.ua
 Group 4: ukr-football.org.ua
 Group 5: ukr-football.org.ua
 Group 6: ukr-football.org.ua
 Final: ukr-football.org.ua

Ukraine
Championship
Football Championship of the Ukrainian SSR